Bessey may refer to:

Places
 Bessey, a commune in the Loire department in central France
 Bessey-en-Chaume, a commune in the Côte-d'Or department in eastern France
 Bessey-la-Cour, a commune in the Côte-d'Or department in eastern France
 Bessey-lès-Cîteaux, a commune in the Côte-d'Or department in Burgundy in eastern France

Other uses
 Bessey (surname)

See also
 Bessey system, Bessey's taxonomic plant system
 Dudley-Bessey House, an historic family house located in Stuart, Martin County, Florida, United States